Bert Wilson may refer to:

 Bert Wilson (sportscaster) (1911–1955), American baseball broadcaster
 Bert Wilson (ice hockey) (1949–1992), ice hockey player
 Bert Wilson (musician) (1939–2013), American jazz clarinetist and saxophonist
 Bertram Martin Wilson (1896–1935), English mathematician
 Robert P. Wilson, American football player and coach, head football coach at Wesleyan University (1898–1902) and New York University (1903)

See also
 Albert Wilson (disambiguation)
 Robert Wilson (disambiguation)
 Herbert Wilson (disambiguation)
 Hubert Wilson (disambiguation)
 Bertie Wilson, polo player, see Harold Ernest Brassey